Ostercappeln is a municipality in the district of Osnabrück, in Lower Saxony, Germany. It is situated in the Wiehengebirge, approx. 15 km northeast of Osnabrück. The municipality is made up of three villages, Ostercappeln, Venne and Schwagstorf, along the Bundesstraße 218. Ostercappeln is the location of the St. Raphael hospital, which serves a general hospital for the surrounding municipalities and as a center for pulmonary diseases for the district.

Mayor
Since 2021: Erik Ballmeyer

International relations

Ostercappeln is twinned with:

  Bolbec, France, since 1966

Sons and daughters of Ostercappeln

 Ludwig Windthorst (1812-1891), politician
 Michael Hohnstedt (born 1988), German footballer
 Timo Beermann (born 1990), German footballer
 Moritz Heyer (born 1995), German footballer. John Ernst Hanxleden, (born 17th C., Died 18th C., Worked in India, Kerala.)Lexicographer, Grammarian, Sanskrit Scholar, Malayalam Poet.

References

Osnabrück (district)